Greatest Hits (also titled as Back it On up: Greatest Hits) is a career-spanning greatest hits album by the Washington, D.C.-based go-go musician Chuck Brown. The album was released in 1998, and consists of a compilation of a compilation of eleven digitally remastered songs from his previously released studio and live albums.

Track listing

Personnel
 Chuck Brown – lead vocals, electric guitar
 John M. Buchannan – keyboards, trombone
 Leroy Fleming – tenor saxophone, background vocals
 Curtis Johnson – keyboards
 Donald Tillery – trumpet, background vocals
 Ricardo D. Wellman – drums
 Rowland Smith – congas, background vocals
 Glenn Ellis – bass guitar, percussion
 Reo Edwards – executive producer, audio mixing
 Stephan Meyner – executive producer

See also
Best of Chuck Brown, 2005 greatest hits album

References

External links
Chuck Brown: Greatest Hits at Discogs

1998 greatest hits albums
Chuck Brown albums
Rhythm and blues compilation albums